Franca Rame (18 July 1929 – 29 May 2013) was an Italian theatre actress, playwright and political activist. She was married to Nobel laureate playwright Dario Fo and is the mother of writer Jacopo Fo. Fo dedicated his Nobel Prize to her.

Biography

Franca Rame was born in Parabiago, Lombardy, in 1929, into a family with a long theatre tradition. She made her theatrical debut in 1951. Shortly thereafter, she met Dario Fo, whom she married in 1954. Their son, Jacopo was born on 31 March 1955. In 1958, she co-founded the Dario Fo–Franca Rame Theatre Company in Milan, with Fo as the director and writer, and Rame the leading actress and administrator.

Rame continued working with Fo through many plays and several theatre companies, popular success and government censorship. She was active in Soccorso Rosso (Red Aid), writing letters and providing books for prisoners and assisting their families and lawyers. In the 1970s, Rame began writing plays (often stage monologues) of her own, such as Grasso è bello! and Tutta casa, letto e chiesa, which displayed a markedly feminist bent.

In March 1973, fascists who were reportedly commissioned by high-ranking officials in Milan's Carabinieri (Italian gendarmerie) abducted Rame, held her at gunpoint and dumped her in a van. They raped her, beat her, burnt her with cigarettes, slashed her with razor blades and left her in a park. She returned to the stage after two months with new anti-fascist monologues.

Rame became a member of the PCI in 1967. She was a member of the Italian Senate representing the centre-left anti-corruption Italy of Values (IdV) party. In 2006, she was designated candidate for President of Italy by IdV's leader, Antonio Di Pietro, but she obtained only 24 votes on the first ballot of the presidential election. From 2010 she was, also with her husband, an independent member of the Communist Refoundation Party.

She died in Milan in 2013, at the age of 83, and is buried at the city's Monumental Cemetery.

Partial filmography
 Ha fatto tredici (1951)
 Poppy (1952)
 Lo svitato (1956)
 Rascel-Fifì (1957)

References

Further reading
D'Angeli, Concetta & Soriani, Simone (eds). Coppia d'arte. Dario Fo e Franca Rame, Pisa, Plus, 2006
Soriani, Simone. Franca Rame, l'altra metà del cielo. "Fermenti", n. 254, 2022, pp. 86-96
d'Arcangeli, Luciana and Pagliaro, Annamaria (eds). “Dario Fo & Franca Rame. Beyond the Rules”, Spunti e Ricerche,Volume 31, 2016, published in 2017. 
d'Arcangeli, Luciana. "Franca Rame’s Dowry:  How the Rame Family Tradition Lives on in the Theatre of Dario Fo and Franca Rame" in Donatella Fischer (ed.) The Tradition of the Actor-Author in Italian Theatre. Oxford. Legenda, Italian Perspectives, 27, 2013, pp. 136–145.
Rame, Franca and Farrell, Joseph. "Non è tempo di nostalgia" – interview with Franca Rame, Della Porta Editori, 2013.
 d'Arcangeli, Luciana. "The Rape by Franca Rame: Political Violence and Political Theatre" in Pierpaolo Antonello and Alan O'Leary (eds) Imagining Terrorism: The Rhetoric and Representation of Political Violence in Italy, 1969–2009. Oxford, Legenda, 2009, pp. 101–115.
 d'Arcangeli, Luciana. "Dario Fo, Franca Rame and the Censors" in Guido Bonsaver and Robert Gordon (eds) Culture, Censorship and the State in 20th Century Italy. Oxford, Legenda, 2005, pp. 158–167.
 d'Arcangeli, Luciana. Madness in the Theatre of Dario Fo and Franca Rame. Forum Italicum,  Stony Brook (NY), Spring, 2005, pp. 138–165.
 d'Arcangeli, Luciana. 'Franca Rame: Pedestal, Megaphone or Female Jester?' in Ed Emery (ed) Research Papers on the Theatre of Dario Fo and Franca Rame. Cambridge, 28–30 April 2000". London and Sydney, Red Notes, 2002, pp. 49–59.
 Farrell, Joseph. Dario Fo and Franca Rame: harlequins of the revolution. Methuen, 2001.
 Jenkins, Ronald Scott. Dario Fo & Franca Rame: artful laughter. Aperture, 2001.
 
 Valeri, Walter (ed). Franca Rame. A Woman on Stage. West Lafayette, Bordighera Press – Purdue University, Indiana 2000.

External links

 Official website
 

1929 births
2013 deaths
Candidates for President of Italy
People from Parabiago
Italian Communist Party politicians
Communist Refoundation Party politicians
Italy of Values politicians
Senators of Legislature XV of Italy
Italian actresses
Italian socialist feminists
Italian women dramatists and playwrights
Italian dramatists and playwrights
Theatre people from Milan
Kidnapped Italian people